Allen Maxwell (April 19, 1943 – March 10, 2014) was an American politician.

From Warren, Arkansas, Maxwell went to University of Arkansas at Monticello and was a human resource manager for Southwestern Bell. He then served in the Arkansas House of Representatives from 2004 to 2010. Maxwell then served as Mayor of Monticello, Arkansas and died from a heart attack while still serving office.

Notes

1943 births
2014 deaths
People from Bradley County, Arkansas
People from Monticello, Arkansas
University of Arkansas at Monticello alumni
Mayors of places in Arkansas
Members of the Arkansas House of Representatives